The Pontifical Catholic University of Valparaíso History Institute is a Chilean academic unit that is part of the Pontifical Catholic University of Valparaíso's Philosophy and Education Faculty.

The History Institute dates back to 1952 when it was founded by the Pontificia Universidad Católica de Valparaíso (PUCV), which created the Institute alongside the then-new Institute of Pedagogy in English. With the goal of organizing the School of History, the Institute hired the University of Chile scholar Héctor Herrera Cajas. In 1957, the Institute had its first compliment when the Superior Council approved the creation of the Crescente Errázuriz Institute, an institution dedicated to the research on Ecclesiastical History. Its first director was Guillermo Monckeberg.

The experimental University reform was undertaken by PUCV during the 1967–1969 period and had as effect suppression of the old teaching faculties, and for this reason, the Social Sciences and History School became an autonomous academic unit. It was renamed as History and Geography Institute and was under History and Geography Department structure. Subsequently, on July 25, 1972, a Decree issued by Rectory established the division of History and Geography Institute into two different academic units.

The Master's degree in History was created in 1983. This postgraduate degree is generally attended by students from careers such as law, philosophy, literature, among others. It includes three main areas of study: Economic and Social History, Political History and Cultural History. After the first semester, the student must choose one of the three options. Likewise, the Institute also offers a Ph.D. in History under the inspiration of training "professionals capable of building new historiographical knowledge and who possess theoretical and methodological guidelines in the discipline and in the interdisciplinary field".

History

The pedagogical and humanistic growth of Pontificia Universidad Católica de Valparaíso was not part of its objectives when it was inaugurated in 1928, but focused on technical and commercial studies. In the late 1940s, the Faculty of Philosophy and Education was created, opening with Mathematics, Physics, Spanish and Philosophy schools. Seeking to reinforce the university's pedagogy and humanities studies, in 1952, Rector Jorge González Förster SJ, created the School of History and Geography as part of the mentioned pedagogical faculty. Under Raúl Montes SJ, direction, and with a reduced teaching body made up of Professors Rafael Gandolfo (SS.CC), Guillermo Mönckeberg (SDB), Juan Montedónico, and Aída Chaparro Galdames, an initial enrolment of 30 students had to be accommodated, without having an adequate library for academic requirements.

The real institutional and academic organization of the School occurred in 1955 when Professor Héctor Herrera Cajas, from Universidad de Chile, assumed position as director. The Students Center was created that year and the following year both the Teaching Council and the teaching assistantships began to function. Likewise, that year the teaching staff reached its full complement: Raimundo Barros SJ., Romolo Trebbi del Trevigiano, Fernando Manríquez, Jorge Siles Salinas, Oscar Fabres, Florencio Rivera and teachers María Teresa Cobos Noriega and María Eugenia del Valle. In the following years saw Rómulo Santana, Mario Orellana, Julius Spinner, Lajos Janosa, Marco Antonio Huesbe and Mario Góngora join as lecturers. At that time, the School was located in Casa Central at Valparaíso.

The students' Reform Movement ended after the military coup that ousted President Salvador Allende. The Military Junta, Pinochet dictatorship's mainstay, appointed new university authorities until 1990 when christian–democrat Patricio Aylwin assumed Presidency of the Republic on 11 March 1990.

In 1976, university faculties were recreated again, and the History Institute returned to its position within the Faculty of Philosophy and Education. After Reform, the Institute is based in researching and formation of high-school teachers. In addition to the scholastic renewal of the staff, it demanded postgraduate studies for the future teachers.

1985−present
From 1985 to date, the History Institute is located at Palacio Valle around Alvares Avenue in Vina Del Mar.

References

Further reading
 
 

History institutes
History departments in Chile
History organisations based in Chile